Liberi tutti is a 2019 Italian television series written and directed by Giacomo Ciarrapico and Luca Vendruscolo.

Produced by Rai Fiction and Italian International Film, it was released on RaiPlay on 14 December 2019. The series aired on Rai 3 in May 2020.

Cast

Main cast
Giorgio Tirabassi as Michele Venturi
Anita Caprioli as Eleonora
Thomas Trabacchi as Riccardo
Valeria Bilello as Nicoletta
Caterina Guzzanti as Martina
Ludovica Martino as Chiara
Massimo De Lorenzo as Giovanni
Ugo Dighero as Mario
Giordano De Plano as Lapo
Rosanna Gentili as Iolde
Lino Musella as Domenico
Franco Pinelli as Pasquale
Carlo De Ruggieri as Spy 1
Luca Amorosino as Spy 2
Andrea Roncato as JJ

Guest cast
Giulia Anchisi as Idea
Emiliano Campagnola as Alberto
Giulia Mombelli as Giulia
Romana Maggiora Vergano as Valentina
Maurizio Pepe as Marcus
Gerhard Koloneci as Gleb
Cristina Pellegrino as the Magistrate
Andrea Bruschi as Maurizio Tavani
Adelmo Togliani as Prince Ciro Del Poggio di Filicudi
Emanuele Linfatti as the artist
Giulio Ferretto as Andrea Quattropani
Lele Marchitelli as Guglielmo
Ivan Urbinati as Menicucci

See also
List of Italian television series

References

External links
 

Italian television series